This is a list of Amarilloans, notable current and former citizens of Amarillo, Texas.

Arts and entertainment
Jennifer Archer, author
Art Bell, radio host and author
Lacey Brown, folk singer and American Idol finalist
Gail Caldwell, Pulitzer Prize-winning book critic
Derek Cecil, actor (Push, Nevada)
Cyd Charisse, dancer and actress (The Band Wagon, Brigadoon)
Ann Doran, actress (Rebel Without a Cause)
Joe Ely, country and folk singer
Ron Ely, actor (Tarzan)
Todd English, celebrity chef
Kevin Fowler, country music singer
Blair Garner, country music radio host
Jimmy Gilmer, rock singer ("Sugar Shack")
Jimmie Dale Gilmore, country music singer
Clyde Kenneth Harris, soldier and interior decorator
Kimberly Willis Holt, author
Mitchell Hurwitz, TV writer
Sterling Hyltin, ballet dancer
Carolyn Jones, actress (The Addams Family)
Grady Nutt, comedian (Hee Haw)
Hayden Pedigo, musician 
John Rich, guitar player
Eck Robertson, musician
Ben Sargent, Pulitzer Prize-winning editorial cartoonist
George Saunders, writer, winner of Macarthur Fellowship Genius Grant
J.D. Souther, country rock singer
Terry LaVerne Stafford, songwriter
Francie Swift, actress
Jodi Thomas, author
Paula Trickey, actress (Pacific Blue)
Aaron Watson, country music singer
Trent Willmon, country music singer
Jack Wrather, television director
M. K. Wren, mystery and science fiction writer
Roger Miller, country music singer
Arden Cho, actress

Business
T. Boone Pickens, Jr., oilman and philanthropist

Law and government
James R. Beverley, governor of Puerto Rico
Teel Bivins, United States Ambassador to Sweden
Beau Boulter, United States Congressman
James Nathan Browning, Texas lieutenant governor
Odell M. Conoley, USMC; Deputy Director for Operations, Plans, Policies and Operations Division, Staff of the Commander in Chief, United States European Command 
Jake Ellzey, United States Congressman
Howard D. Graves, Superintendent of the U.S. Military Academy at West Point, later Chancellor of Texas A & M system of universities
John Marvin Jones, United States Congressman and Chief Judge of the Court of Claims
Walter Thomas Price, IV, Amarillo attorney and Republican nominee for the District 87 seat in the Texas House of Representatives
Kel Seliger, mayor and Texas state senator

Sports
Rex Baxter, professional golfer and NCAA champion
 Trevor Brazile, PRCA All Around Cowboy
Brad Bryant, professional golfer
Paul Buentello, mixed martial artist
Steve Butler, racecar driver
Ron Clinkscale, professional Canadian football player
Michael Cobbins (born 1992), basketball player for Maccabi Haifa of the Israeli Basketball Premier League
Tucker Davidson, professional baseball player
Bobby Duncum Jr., professional wrestler 
Dory Funk, professional wrestler
Dory Funk, Jr., professional wrestler
Terry Funk, professional wrestler
Heath Herring, mixed martial artist
Mike Hettinga, aka Mike Knox, professional wrestler
Ziggy Hood, professional football player
Wildcat Monte (born Monte Deadwiley; 1905–1961), professional boxer
Alex O'Brien, professional tennis player
Barry Orton, professional wrestler
Ryan Palmer, professional golfer
Bum Phillips, professional football coach
Cody Pfister, mixed martial artist
Chris Romero, professional wrestler
Mark Romero, professional wrestler
Ricky Romero, professional wrestler
Steven Romero, professional wrestler
Hurles Scales, professional football player
Mike Scroggins, professional bowler
Brandon Slay, gold-medal Olympic wrestler
T.A. "Amarillo Slim" Preston, professional poker player
Evan Tanner, professional mixed martial artist
William Thomas, professional football player
Devonte Upson (born 1993), basketball player in the Israeli Basketball Premier League
Ken Vinyard, professional football player
Erik Watts, professional wrestler
Gene Wiley, professional basketball player

Others

Charles Albright, serial killer
George Hendricks Beverley, U.S. Air Force general
Thomas E. Creek, U.S. Marine Corps Medal of Honor recipient
Brittany Holberg, convicted murderer who was sentenced to death row
Rick Husband, astronaut
Paul Lockhart, astronaut
Leroy Matthiesen, local Catholic bishop
Grady Booch, software engineer

Amarillo, Texas
 
Amarillo